MDOP may refer to:
Malicious Destruction of Property
Microsoft Desktop Optimization Pack